The  is a road in Uruma, Okinawa, Japan.  long, it forms part of Okinawa Prefectural Road No. 10 and runs across the sea.

Construction
The road consists of a causeway with a bridge so vessels may pass. There are two rivers or water lanes for preventing seawater contamination.

History
An area of shoal extended between the Yakena area of the Katsuren Peninsula and Henza Island. At low tide, it was shallow enough for people to walk across on the sea bed. Since 1956, amphibious vehicles, or used trucks of United States origin, drove to and from the island. In 1960, islanders started a campaign for the construction of a road connecting the island and the peninsula. Construction began, but a typhoon came and interrupted the progress. In 1970, Gulf Oil started constructing port facilities for petroleum storage and reshipment on Henza Island.

Gulf funded the construction of The Mid-Sea road. The completed Mid-Sea Road was presented to the Yonashiro Village free of charge in 1974 and became a village road. In 1991, it was made a prefectural road. In 1999, the road was expanded to 4-lanes.

Katsuren Peninsula and other islands
On the Katsuren Peninsula is Katsuren Castle. Connected by the Mid-Sea Road are the Katsuren Peninsula, Henza Island, Miyagi Island, Ikei Island, and Hamahiga Island.

See also
 Seven Mile Bridge
 Overseas Highway

Footnotes

References
 Henza Jichikai(Henza Autonomous Organization),Furukiwo Tazunete (In search of old days) 1985, p. 22. pp.166-170, pp.329-332.

Roads in Japan
Transport in Okinawa Prefecture
Bridges completed in 1972